Leonard "Len" Skowronski (born c. 1941) is a politician who was the leader of the provincial Social Credit Party in Alberta, Canada, between 2007 and 2016. He was elected at a leadership convention held on November 3, 2007 in Red Deer to replace Lavern Ahlstrom who resigned.

Skowronski lives in Calgary, and ran as a candidate in the 2004 Alberta election as a Social Credit candidate in Calgary Varsity. He was defeated, finishing last in a field of six candidates. He contested the 2008 election in the electoral district of Calgary-Bow and again finished last in a field of six. He contested the 2009 by-election in Calgary-Glenmore, placing sixth out of seven candidates, and receiving 28 votes more than the independent candidate who placed seventh.

In 2016, Skowronski denounced the "invalid takeover" of the party by anti-abortion activists leading to his replacement as party leader by Jeremy Fraser.

Electoral record

References

External links
Social Credit Constituency Associations

1940s births
Living people
Alberta Social Credit Party leaders
University of Alberta alumni
University of Calgary alumni
Alberta Social Credit Party candidates in Alberta provincial elections
21st-century Canadian politicians